A gong is a percussive musical instrument or a warning bell.

Gong or GONG may also refer to:

Places
Gong, Iran, a city
21523 GONG, an asteroid discovered in 1998
Gong County, Henan, former name of Gongyi, a city in Henan, China
Gong County, Sichuan, a county in Sichuan, China
Wollongong, ("the Gong"), a seaside city located in the Illawarra region of New South Wales, Australia
Zhonggong, a pejorative name for Communist-controlled China (1927–49)

People
Gong as a name may refer to:
Gong (surname), several Chinese surnames
Gong, the pseudonym of Jonathan Crowther, a composer of Listener Crosswords
Gong Baoren, Chinese Olympic swimmer
Alex Gong (1971–2003), Chinese-American kickboxer 
Gong Guohua (born 1964), Chinese decathlete
Leonard Howell, known as The Gong, founder of the Rastafari movement
Gong Hwang-cherng (1934–2010), linguist from Taiwan
Gong Li (born 1965), Chinese film actress 
Gong Ruina (born 1981), Chinese badminton player
Gong Zhichao (born 1977), Chinese badminton player

Arts, entertainment, and media

Music
Gong (band), a Franco-British rock band
The Gongs, an experimental folk band
"Gong", a song on the album Takk... by the Icelandic band Sigur Rós

Television
GONG (IPTV channel), an Internet Protocol Television channel specialising in anime
The Gong Show, American television variety show spoof (1976-1980)
Palace (TV series) (Gōng), a Chinese TV series

Other arts, entertainment, and media
Gong (magazine), a German television magazine
Gong bass drum, a type of drum

Organizations
GONG (organization), a Croatian non-government organization that oversees elections
Global Oscillations Network Group, studying solar structure and dynamics

Other uses
Gong (title), a title of Chinese nobility generally translated as "duke"
Gōng or Guang (vessel), an ancient Chinese shape of ritual ewer
Gong farmer, term used in Tudor Britain for a person who emptied privies and cesspits
Gong Gong, Chinese water god
Gong language

See also
Kong (surname) (孔), a Korean and Chinese surname